Grabar, or Classical Armenian, is the oldest attested form of the Armenian language.

Grabar may also refer to:

People
 André Grabar (1896–1990), Ukrainian-born art historian
 Oleg Grabar (1929–2011), French-born art historian and archeologist
 Igor Grabar (1871–1960), Russian painter, publisher, restorer and art historian
 Vladimir Grabar (1865–1956), Russian and Soviet jurist
 Kolinda Grabar-Kitarović (born 1968), former President of Croatia

See also
Hrabar (disambiguation), a related name